Jeannette Anne Bailey (9 April 1931 – 26 March 2008) was a British fencer. She competed in the women's team foil event at the 1960 Summer Olympics.

References

1931 births
2008 deaths
British female fencers
Olympic fencers of Great Britain
Fencers at the 1960 Summer Olympics
Sportspeople from London